Pirrie is a surname. Notable people with the surname include:

Alexander Mactier Pirrie FRAI (1882–1907), Scottish anthropologist
Chloe Pirrie (born 1987), Scottish actress
Dick Pirrie (1920–1944), Australian rules footballer
Kevin Pirrie (1922–2006), Australian rules footballer
Richard Pirrie (1879–1962), former Australian rules footballer
Stephen Pirrie (born 1961), former Australian rules footballer
William Pirrie, 1st Viscount Pirrie, KP, PC, PC (Ire) (1847–1924), British shipbuilder and businessman
William Pirrie (surgeon) FRSE LLD (1807–1882), Scottish surgeon and medical author
William Pirrie Sinclair (1837–1900), politician in the United Kingdom, twice elected to the House of Commons

See also
Pirrie v McFarlane, landmark decision of the High Court of Australia on Intergovernmental immunity between tiers of government in the Australian Constitution
Piri (disambiguation)
Pirie (disambiguation)
Pirri